Jacqueline Chabbi (born in 1943) is a historian and a professor of Arab Studies at the University of Paris-VIII (Paris Saint-Denis). Her research concerns the history of the medieval Muslim world.

Biography
Chabbi holds a graduate agrégée of Arabic and she presented a thesis in 1992 on State Arab and Islamic Studies at the University Paris-Sorbonne 1. She was associated University Professor.

Selected bibliography

Books
Dieu de la Bible, Dieu du Coran [God of the Bible, God of the Koran] (with Thomas Römer), Paris: Seuil, 2020, 304 pages, 
On a perdu Adam. La création dans le Coran [Adam went lost: Creation in the Koran], Paris: Seuil, 2019, 372 pages, 
Les Trois Piliers de l'islam : Lecture anthropologique du Coran [The three pillers of Islam: an anthropological reading of the Koran], Paris: Seuil, 2016, 384 pages,  / Reprint "Points Essais", 2018, 
 Le Coran décrypté : Figures bibliques en Arabie [The Koran deciphered: biblical figures in Arabia], preface by André Caquot, 415 pages, Paris: Editions Fayard (2008), . Reprinted by Cerf, "Lexio" series, 2014, 
 Le Seigneur des tribus. L'islam de Mahomet [The lord of the tribes: the Islam of Mohammed], 725 pages, Paris: Noesis (Agnes Viénot) (1997), . Reprinted by Editions du CNRS, 734 pages, 2010, 
L'Arabie occidentale au début du septième siècle : Étude des représentations et des mentalités [West Arabia at the beginning of the 7th century: a study of representations and mentalities], Lille: A.N.R.T., 1992 
Maître et disciples dans les traditions religieuses [Master and disciples in religious traditions] (collective work), Paris: Cerf, 1990

Articles
Chabbi is the author of many articles, including some about Sufism.

 Article Sufism in the Encyclopædia Universalis.
 Article Martyrdom of Al-Hallaj in the Encyclopædia Universalis.
 Notes on the historical development of ascetical and mystical movements in Khursan, Studia Islamica, No. XLVI, 1977, p. 5-72.

Notes
The manuscript is entitled "L'Arabie occidentale au début du septième siècle". The work, led by Jamel Eddine Bencheikh focuses on the historical and social context of production and reading of the Koran (representations and attitudes in western Arabia in the early seventh century). Source SUDOC (thesis + Jacqueline + Chabbi).

References

External links
http://www.liberation.fr/societe/2013/02/15/mahomet-le-prophete-posthume_882151
http://www.mondedelabible.com/portrait-de-chercheur/portrait-de-jacqueline-chabbi/

Living people
1943 births
French Arabists